Tonghua Sanyuanpu Airport , also known as Tonghua Liuhe Airport, is a dual-use military and civilian airport serving the city of Tonghua in Jilin Province, China.  It is located in the town of Sanyuanpu in Liuhe County, 50 kilometers from the city center.  Originally a military airport, construction to convert it for civilian use started in October 2009 with a total investment of 370 million yuan. The airport was opened on 18 June 2014, becoming the fifth civilian airport in Jilin.

Facilities
The airport has a runway that is 2,300 meters long and 45 meters wide, and a 3,000 square meter terminal building.  It is designed to handle 194,000 passengers annually by 2020.

Airlines and destinations

See also
List of airports in China
List of the busiest airports in China
List of People's Liberation Army Air Force airbases

References

Airports in Jilin
Chinese Air Force bases
Airports established in 2014
2014 establishments in China